Mercedes Brianna Russell (born July 27, 1995) is an American professional basketball player for the Seattle Storm of the Women's National Basketball Association (WNBA). She was drafted 22nd overall by the New York Liberty in the 2018 WNBA draft. Russell played center for the Tennessee Lady Volunteers basketball team in college. In high school, she was named 2013 Gatorade Girls' Basketball Player of the Year.

College
Russell played college basketball at the University of Tennessee in Knoxville, Tennessee for the Lady Volunteers.

Statistics 

|-
|2013–14
|Tennessee
|35
|5
|18.5
|.596
|.000
|.514
|5.0
|0.5
|0.4
|1.1
|1.2
|6.3
|-
|2014–15
|Tennessee
|colspan="12"|Injured
|-
| style="text-align:left;"| 2015–16
| style="text-align:left;"| Tennessee
|36
|31
|29.3
|.548
|.000
|.545
|8.3
|0.8
|0.4
|1.8
|1.6
|9.9
|-
|2016–17
|Tennessee
|32
|32
|34.6
|.562
|.000
|.671
|9.7
|1.2
|0.7
|1.4
|2.0
|16.1
|-
|2017–18
|Tennessee
|33
|33
|32.7
|.583
|.000
|.682
|9.2
|0.8
|1.1
|1.3
|1.4
|15.3
|-
|Career
|
|136
|101
|28.6
|.570
|.000
|.622
|8.0
|0.8
|0.6
|1.4
|1.6
|11.7

Career

WNBA
At the 2018 WNBA Draft, Russell was drafted in the second round by the New York Liberty. After making her WNBA debut with the Liberty, Russell was waived and soon after picked up by the Seattle Storm. In joining the Storm's line-up featuring players such as Sue Bird, Breanna Stewart and Natasha Howard, Russell would take home a WNBA Championship in her first professional season.

WNBL
In 2019, Russell was signed by the newly rebranded Southside Flyers in Australia's Women's National Basketball League (WNBL). There she would play alongside the likes of Leilani Mitchell and Jenna O'Hea.

Career statistics

WNBA

Regular season

|-
| align="left" | 2018
| align="left" | New York
| 2 || 0 || 16.0 || .333 || – || .750 || 1.5 || 1.0 || 1.0 || 0.5 || 0.5 || 2.5
|-
| align="left" | 2018
| align="left" | Seattle
| 22 || 0 || 4.6 || .484 || – || .500 || 1.4 || 0.1 || 0.0 || 0.1 || 0.3 || 1.6
|-
| align="left" | 2019
| align="left" | Seattle
| 34 || 30 || 25.6 || .520 || – || .646 || 6.1 || 1.0 || 1.1 || 0.5 || 1.0 || 7.5
|-
|style="text-align:left;background:#afe6ba;"| 2020†
| style="text-align:left;"| Seattle
| 22 || 2 || 13.8 || .410 || – || .560 || 3.2 || 0.6 || 0.4 || 0.4 || 0.7 || 3.5
|-
| align="left" | 2021
| align="left" | Seattle
| 30 || 28 || 24.7 || .617 || – || .766 || 6.1 || 1.6 || 0.9 || 0.4 || 1.3 || 7.3
|-
| align="left" | 2022
| align="left" | Seattle
| 5 || 0 || 10.8 || .500 || – || .667 || 1.8 || 0.2 || 0.0 || 0.0 || 1.4 || 2.0
|-
| align="left" | Career
| align="left" | 5 years, 2 teams
| 115 || 60 || 18.3 || .529 || – || .662 || 4.4 || 0.9 || 0.6 || 0.3 || 0.9 || 5.2
|}

Postseason

|-
| align="left" | 2018
| align="left" | Seattle
| 1 || 0 || 4.0 || .– || – || – || 1.0 || 0.0 || 0.0 || 0.0 || 0.0 || 0.0
|-
| align="left" | 2019
| align="left" | Seattle
| 2 || 2 || 32.0 || .769 || – || 1.000 || 8.5 || 2.0 || 0.0 || 1.0 || 1.0 || 11.5
|-
|style="text-align:left;background:#afe6ba;"| 2020†
| style="text-align:left;"| Seattle
| 6 || 0 || 17.5 || .619 || – || 1.000 || 3.8 || 1.0 || 0.2 || 0.2 || 0.8|| 5.2
|-
| style='text-align:left;'|2021
| style='text-align:left;'|Seattle
| 1 || 1 || 45.0 || .556 || – || – || 12.0 || 4.0 || 0.0 || 2.0 || 0.0 || 10.0
|-
| align="left" | Career
| align="left" | 4 years, 1 team
| 10 || 3 || 21.8 || .651 || – || 1.000 || 5.3 || 1.4 || 0.1 || 0.5 || 0.7 || 6.4
|}

References

External links
Tennessee Lady Vols bio

1995 births
Living people
American expatriate basketball people in Australia
American expatriate basketball people in Turkey
American women's basketball players
Basketball players from Oregon
Centers (basketball)
Galatasaray S.K. (women's basketball) players
McDonald's High School All-Americans
New York Liberty draft picks
New York Liberty players
Parade High School All-Americans (girls' basketball)
People from Springfield, Oregon
Seattle Storm players
Tennessee Lady Volunteers basketball players